Aberdeen competed in the Scottish Premier League, Scottish Cup and Scottish League Cup in season 2006–07. Their third place in the Scottish Premier League was their highest since the 1995–96 season.

Statistics

Appearances and Goals

|}

Source: AFC Heritage

Results

Friendlies

Scottish Premier League

Scottish League Cup

Scottish Cup

Players

Squad

Goalscorers

Source: BBC Sport
Ordered by: Total, SPL, Cups then Name 
Name: Players's Name, flag next to name indicates player's nationality. SPL: No. of goals scored in the Scottish Premier League. Cups: No. of goals scored in the Scottish League Cup, Scottish Cup and Uefa Cup. Total: Total No. of competitive goals scored.

Competitions

Overall

SPL

Classification

Results summary

Results by round

Results by opponent

Source: 2006–07 Scottish Premier League article

Club

The management

Other information

See also
 List of Aberdeen F.C. seasons

References

Aberdeen F.C. seasons
Aberdeen